The 1992 Cleveland Indians season was the 92nd season for the franchise. 
The Indians were named "Organization of the Year" by Baseball America in 1992, in response to the appearance of offensive bright spots and an improving farm system.

Offseason
 October 7, 1991: Mike York was released by the Indians.
 November 15, 1991: Greg Swindell was traded by the Indians to the Cincinnati Reds for Jack Armstrong, Scott Scudder, and Joe Turek (minors).
 November 20, 1991: Derek Lilliquist was selected off waivers by the Indians from the San Diego Padres.
 December 6, 1991: Jesse Orosco was sent by the Indians to the Milwaukee Brewers as part of a conditional deal.
 December 9, 1991: Pete Rose Jr. was drafted by the Indians from the Chicago White Sox in the 1991 rule 5 draft.
 December 10, 1991: Willie Blair and Eddie Taubensee were traded by the Indians to the Houston Astros for Kenny Lofton and Dave Rohde.
 January 27, 1992: Brook Jacoby was signed as a free agent by the Indians.

Regular season

Season standings

Record vs. opponents

Notable transactions
 April 3, 1992: Shawn Hillegas was selected off waivers from the Indians by the Toronto Blue Jays.
 April 9, 1992: Eric Plunk was signed as a free agent by the Indians.
 June 1, 1992: 1992 Major League Baseball draft
Paul Shuey was drafted by the Indians in the 1st round (2nd pick).
Matt Williams was drafted by the Indians in the 4th round.
 July 4, 1992: Alex Cole was traded by the Indians to the Pittsburgh Pirates for Tony Mitchell (minors).

Opening Day Lineup

Roster

Statistics

Batting
Note: G = Games played; AB = At bats; R = Runs scored; H = Hits; 2B = Doubles; 3B = Triples; HR = Home runs; RBI = Runs batted in; AVG = Batting average; SB = Stolen bases

Pitching
Note: W = Wins; L = Losses; ERA = Earned run average; G = Games pitched; GS = Games started; SV = Saves; IP = Innings pitched; R = Runs allowed; ER = Earned runs allowed; BB = Walks allowed; K = Strikeouts

Award winners

All-Star Game
Sandy Alomar Jr., starting catcher
Carlos Baerga, reserve
Charles Nagy, reserve

Minor league affiliates

References

1992 Cleveland Indians at Baseball Reference
1992 Cleveland Indians at Baseball Almanac

Cleveland Guardians seasons
Cleveland Indians season
Cleve